Gleniti is a suburb of Timaru, in the South Canterbury district and Canterbury region of New Zealand's South Island. It is located west of the town centre.

The is a hybrid of the Scottish term glen and the original Māori name for the area Wai-iti (which translates as little water).

Demographics

Gleniti had a population of 3,924 at the 2018 New Zealand census, an increase of 417 people (11.9%) since the 2013 census, and an increase of 720 people (22.5%) since the 2006 census. There were 1,554 households. There were 1,863 males and 2,061 females, giving a sex ratio of 0.9 males per female, with 624 people (15.9%) aged under 15 years, 513 (13.1%) aged 15 to 29, 1,590 (40.5%) aged 30 to 64, and 1,194 (30.4%) aged 65 or older.

Ethnicities were 93.7% European/Pākehā, 4.5% Māori, 1.1% Pacific peoples, 3.9% Asian, and 1.6% other ethnicities (totals add to more than 100% since people could identify with multiple ethnicities).

The proportion of people born overseas was 13.2%, compared with 27.1% nationally.

Although some people objected to giving their religion, 39.4% had no religion, 51.7% were Christian, 0.4% were Hindu, 0.2% were Muslim, 0.3% were Buddhist and 1.4% had other religions.

Of those at least 15 years old, 507 (15.4%) people had a bachelor or higher degree, and 756 (22.9%) people had no formal qualifications. The employment status of those at least 15 was that 1,422 (43.1%) people were employed full-time, 504 (15.3%) were part-time, and 48 (1.5%) were unemployed.

Education
Gleniti School is a coeducational state full primary school (years 1-8). It has a roll of  students as of  It first opened in 1879.

References

Suburbs of Timaru